In mathematics, the Erdős–Ko–Rado theorem limits the number of sets in a family of sets for which every two sets have at least one element in common. Paul Erdős, Chao Ko, and Richard Rado proved the theorem in 1938, but did not publish it until 1961. It is part of the field of combinatorics, and one of the central results of 

The theorem applies to families of sets that all have the same  and are all subsets of some larger set of size  One way to construct a family of sets with these parameters, each two sharing an element, is to choose a single element to belong to all the subsets, and then form all of the subsets that contain the chosen element. The Erdős–Ko–Rado theorem states that when  is large enough for the problem to be nontrivial  this construction produces the largest possible intersecting families. When  there are other equally-large families, but for larger values of  only the families constructed in this way can be largest.

The Erdős–Ko–Rado theorem can also be described in terms of hypergraphs or independent sets in Kneser graphs. Several analogous theorems apply to other kinds of mathematical object than sets, including linear subspaces, permutations, and strings. They again describe the largest possible intersecting families as being formed by choosing an element and forming the family of all objects that contain the chosen element.

Statement
Suppose that  is a family of distinct  subsets of an  set  and that each two subsets share at least one element.

The requirement that  is necessary for the problem to be nontrivial:  all  sets intersect, and the largest intersecting family consists of all  sets, with 

The same result can be formulated as part of the theory of hypergraphs. A family of sets may also be called a hypergraph, and when all the sets (which are called "hyperedges" in this context) are the same   it is called an  hypergraph. The theorem thus gives an upper bound for the number of pairwise overlapping hyperedges in an  hypergraph with  

This is a graph with a vertex for each  subset of an  set, and an edge between every pair of disjoint sets. An independent set is a collection of vertices that has no edges between its pairs, and the independence number is the size of the largest  Because Kneser graphs have symmetries taking any vertex to any other vertex (they are vertex-transitive graphs), their fractional chromatic number equals the ratio of their number of vertices to their independence number, so another way of expressing the Erdős–Ko–Rado theorem is that these graphs have fractional chromatic number

History
Paul Erdős, Chao Ko, and Richard Rado proved this theorem in 1938 after working together on it in England.

Maximum and maximal families

Families of maximum size

A simple way to construct  an intersecting family of  sets whose size exactly matches the Erdős–Ko–Rado bound is to choose any fixed  and let  consist of all  subsets that  For instance, for 2-element subsets of the 4-element   this produces the family

When  this is the only intersecting family of this size. However, when , there is a more general construction. Each  set can be matched up to its complement, the only  set from which it is disjoint. Then, choose one set from each of these complementary pairs. For instance, for the same parameters above, this more general construction can be used to form the family

where every two sets intersect despite no element belonging to all three sets. In this example, all of the sets have been complemented from the ones in the first example, but it is also possible to complement only some of the sets.

 families of the first type (variously known as stars, dictatorships, juntas, centered families, or principal families) are the unique maximum families. In this case, a family of nearly-maximum size has an element which is common to almost all of its  This property has been called  although the same term has also been used for a different property, the fact that (for a wide range of parameters) deleting randomly-chosen edges from the Kneser graph does not increase the size of its independent

Maximal intersecting families

An intersecting family of  sets may be maximal, in that no further set can be added (even by extending the ground set) without destroying the intersection property, but not of maximum size.

The smallest possible size of a maximal intersecting family of  sets, in terms  is unknown but at least   Projective planes produce maximal intersecting families whose number of sets  but for infinitely many choices of  there exist smaller maximal intersecting families of 

The largest intersecting families of  sets that are maximal but not maximum have size 

Proofs
The original proof of the Erdős–Ko–Rado theorem used induction  The base case,  follows easily from the facts that an intersecting family cannot include both a set and its complement, and that in this case the bound of the Erdős–Ko–Rado theorem is exactly half the number of all  sets. The induction step for  uses a method called shifting, of substituting elements in intersecting families to make the family smaller in lexicographic order and reduce it to a canonical form that is easier to 

In 1972, Gyula O. H. Katona gave the following short proof using 

It is also possible to derive the Erdős–Ko–Rado theorem as a special case of the Kruskal–Katona theorem, another important result in  Many other proofs are

Related results

Generalizations
A generalization of the theorem applies to subsets that are required to have large intersections. For the original form of the Erdős–Ko–Rado theorem,  In general, for  large enough with respect to the other two parameters, the generalized theorem states that the size of a  family of subsets is at  
More precisely, this bound holds  and does not hold for smaller values  When  the only  families of this size are obtained by designating  as the common intersection of all the subsets, and constructing the family of all  subsets that include these  designated 

The theorem can also be generalized to families in which every  subsets have a common intersection. Because this strengthens the condition that every pair intersects (for which  these families have the same bound on their maximum size,  when  is sufficiently large. However, in this case the meaning of "sufficiently large" can be relaxed from

Analogs
Many results analogous to the Erdős–Ko–Rado theorem, but for other classes of objects than finite sets, are known. These generally involve a statement that the largest families of intersecting objects, for some definition of intersection, are obtained by choosing an element and constructing the family of all objects that include that chosen element. Examples include the following:

There is a -analog of the Erdős–Ko–Rado theorem for intersecting families of linear subspaces over finite fields. If  is an intersecting family of  subspaces of an  vector space over a finite field of   then

where the subscript  marks the notation for the Gaussian binomial coefficient, the number of subspaces of a given dimension within a vector space of a larger dimension over a finite field of  In this case, a largest intersecting family of subspaces may be obtained by choosing any nonzero vector  and constructing the family of subspaces of the given dimension that all contain the chosen 

Two permutations on the same set of elements are defined to be intersecting if there is some element that has the same image under both permutations. On an  set, there is an obvious family of  intersecting permutations, the permutations that fix one of the elements (the stabilizer subgroup of this element). The analogous theorem is that no intersecting family of permutations can be larger, and that the only intersecting families of size  are the cosets of one-element stabilizers. These can be described more directly as the families of permutations that map some fixed element to another fixed element. More generally, for any  and sufficiently large , a family of permutations each pair of which has  elements in common has maximum size , and the only families of this size are cosets of pointwise  Alternatively, in graph theoretic terms, the  permutations correspond to the perfect matchings of a complete bipartite graph  and the theorem states that, among families of perfect matchings each pair of which share  edges, the largest families are formed by the matchings that all contain  chosen  Another analog of the theorem, for partitions of a set, includes as a special case the perfect matchings of a complete graph  (with  even). There are  matchings, where  denotes the double factorial. The largest family of matchings that pairwise intersect (meaning that they have an edge in common) has size  and is obtained by fixing one edge and choosing all ways of matching the remaining  vertices.

A partial geometry is a system of finitely many abstract points and lines, satisfying certain axioms including the requirement that all lines contain the same number of points and all points belong to the same number of lines. In a partial geometry, a largest system of pairwise-intersecting lines can be obtained from the set of lines through any single 

A signed set consists of a set together with sign function that maps each element  Two signed sets may be said to intersect when they have a common element that has the same sign in each of them. Then an intersecting family of  signed sets, drawn from an  universe, consists of at most

signed sets. This number of signed sets may be obtained by fixing one element and its sign and letting the remaining  elements and signs 

The largest intersecting families are obtained by choosing one position and a fixed symbol for that position, and letting the rest of the positions vary arbitrarily. These families consist of  strings, and are the only pairwise intersecting families of this size. These results can be interpreted graph-theoretically in terms of the 

An unproven conjecture, posed by Gil Kalai and Karen Meagher, concerns another analog for the family of triangulations of a convex polygon with  vertices.

Applications
The Erdős–Ko–Rado theorem can be used to prove the following result in probability theory. Let  be independent 0–1 random variables with probability  of being one, and let  be any fixed convex combination of these variables. Then 
The proof involves observing that subsets of variables whose indicator vectors have large convex combinations must be non-disjoint and using the Erdős–Ko–Rado theorem to bound the number of these 

The stability properties of the Erdős–Ko–Rado theorem play a key role in an efficient algorithm for finding monochromatic edges in improper colorings of Kneser graphs. The Erdős–Ko–Rado theorem has also been used to characterize the symmetries of the space of phylogenetic trees.

See also
Helly's theorem, on conditions ensuring that intersecting families of convex sets have a common intersection
Sperner's theorem, an upper bound on families of pairwise non-nested sets
Steiner system, maximum-sized uniform set families in which no pair (rather than every pair) has a large intersection
Sunflower (mathematics), a family of sets where (unlike the maximum intersecting families here) all pairs have equal intersections
Thrackle, an unsolved problem on the size of families of intersecting curves

References

Notes

Works cited

External links

Families of sets
Intersection
Theorems in discrete mathematics
Articles containing proofs
Factorial and binomial topics
Ko-Rado theorem